The Cerros de Mavicuri are three hills, located in eastern Colombia. Geologically, the mountains are part of the Guiana Shield.

Mavicuri is considered a sacred site by the multiple ethnic groups residing in the area. Its name means blowgun of the mountains, named after the tool used by the natives to catch prey.

They are made of volcanic rock and can only be accessed by river.

These mountains are considered one of the main tourist sites in the Department of Guainía and are located within a Puinave indigenous reserve.

Popular culture 
The Cerros de Mavicure are featured in the film Embrace of the Serpent. The Governor of the Guainía Department partly decorated Ciro Guerra, the director of the film, with the Order of the Inrida Flower for highlighting the land feature in the film.

References 

Geography of Guainía Department
Hills of Colombia